IV Xample was an American vocal quartet who recorded successfully in the 1990s and are best remembered for the single "I'd Rather Be Alone" from their gold debut MCA Records album "For Example".

The original members were Andre "Dre" Allen, Robert "Bobby C" Chevis (aka Athemus Chevis), his brother Raymond "Runni Rae" Chevis, and Bryant "Lucious" Woodert.  The group formed in Los Angeles, and first recorded for MCA Records in 1995.  Their first single, "The Swang", achieved popular local radio play in Los Angeles on 92.3 The Beat and went on to #1 on the stations popular 4 play at 4 segment that showcased up and coming local artists. After the song gained popularity, a bidding war between Virgin Records, Giant, and MCA Records took place with MCA coming out the best choice for the group. Upon signing to MCA, they achieved greater commercial success with their next single, "I'd Rather Be Alone", which reached #44 on both the Billboard Hot 100 and Top 40 status on the R&B charts.  The follow-up, "From the Fool", made #95 on the R&B charts.

They released an album, For Example, and toured Japan, Australia, Canada and elsewhere.  Soon afterwards however, Bobby Chevis left the group for a solo career. His recording "Why-Oh-Why", under the name 'B.C.', was a Billboard Hot 100 pop hit in 1999.  The group then split up, with Andre "Dre" Allen later having success as a performer, releasing three solo albums for Tommy Boy Records and his own label Movemakers Entertainment. He also worked as a songwriter, producer and director writing for artists such as Outkast, Master P, Lil Romeo, Babyface, Montell Jordan, En Vogue, Will Downing and Jesse Powell.

References

External links
"90's R & B group IV Xample is back on the scene!" – press release announcing 2010 reunion

African-American musical groups
American contemporary R&B musical groups
Musical groups from Los Angeles
Musical quartets
American soul musical groups
MCA Records artists
Universal Music Group artists